Naval is a municipality located in the province of Huesca, Aragon, Spain. According to the 2018 census (INE), the municipality has a population of 269 inhabitants.

References

External links
Naval on Diputación de Huesca

Municipalities in the Province of Huesca